The Borno Emirate, or Borno Sultanate, is a traditional Nigerian state that was formed at the start of the 20th century. It is headed by the descendants of the rulers of the Bornu Empire, founded before 1000. The rulers have the title Shehu of Borno (var. Shehu of Bornu, Sultan of Borno/u). The traditional emirate of Borno maintains a ceremonial rule of the Kanuri people, based in Maiduguri, Borno State, Nigeria, but acknowledged by the 4 million Kanuri in neighbouring countries.

The current ruling line, the al-Kanemi dynasty, dates to the accession of Muhammad al-Amin al-Kanemi in the early 19th century, displacing the Sayfawa dynasty which had ruled from around 1300.

History

The old Bornu Empire collapsed in 1893 when the Funj warlord Rabih Zubayr ibn Fadlallah seized power and transferred the capital to Dikwa. When the French, then expanding in West Africa, defeated and killed Rabih they installed Shehu Sanda Kura, a member of the old Bornu dynasty, as the first Shehu of Borno in Dikwa in 1900. In 1901, he was succeeded by his brother, Umar Abubakar Garbai, the ancestor of the current Emirs of Borno. Based on a treaty between the French, Germans, and British, the old Bornu was split up and Dikwa became part of the German colony of Cameroon. The British invited Umar Abubakar Garbai to become ruler of the part falling to the British, and he moved in 1902 first to Monguno and later to Maiduguri.
Later Dikwa was transferred to the newly created British Northern Nigeria Protectorate, resulting in two Shehus, the Shehu of Borno based at Maiduguri and the Shehu of Dikwa based at Dikwa.

Rulers

Rulers of the Borno Emirate since the beginning of the colonial period with the title of "Shehu":

Local Government Areas in Borno Emirate 
Borno Emirate covers fifteen Local Government Areas:
 Abadam
 Chibok
 Gubio
 Guzamala
 Jere
 Kaga
 Konduga
 Kukawa
 Mafa
 Magumeri
 Maiduguri
 Marte
 Mobbar
 Monguno
 Nganzai

See also
Bornu Empire
Kanem Empires
Nigerian traditional rulers

References

Maiduguri
Nigerian traditional states
Emirates